Kirill Aleksandrovich Kolesnichenko (born 31 January 2000) is a Russian football player who plays as a left winger or left-back for Rodina-2 Moscow.

Club career
Kolesnichenko made his debut in the Russian Professional Football League for FC Chertanovo Moscow on 30 May 2016 in a game against FC Lokomotiv Liski.

Kolesnichenko made his Russian Premier League debut for FC SKA-Khabarovsk on 17 March 2018 in a game against FC Ural Yekaterinburg.

On 26 March 2020, FC Kairat announced the signing of Kolesnichenko on a three-year contract.

On 3 September 2020, he joined FC Rotor Volgograd on loan. On 20 January 2021, Rotor and FC SKA-Khabarovsk reached a "sub-loan" agreement, according to which Kolesnichenko re-joined SKA until the end of the 2020–21 season.

On 17 June 2021, he signed a long-term contract with FC Ural Yekaterinburg. On 18 August 2022, Kolesnichenko's contract with Ural was terminated by mutual consent.

Career statistics

References

External links
 
 Profile by Russian Professional Football League

2000 births
People from Kamyshin
Sportspeople from Volgograd Oblast
Living people
Russian people of Ukrainian descent
Russian footballers
Russia youth international footballers
Association football midfielders
Association football defenders
FC Chertanovo Moscow players
FC SKA-Khabarovsk players
FC Kairat players
FC Rotor Volgograd players
FC Ural Yekaterinburg players
Russian Premier League players
Russian First League players
Russian Second League players
Russian expatriate footballers
Expatriate footballers in Kazakhstan
Russian expatriate sportspeople in Kazakhstan